Killing Stalking is a South Korean manhwa written and illustrated by Koogi.  It was published online in Korean and English by Lezhin Comics and won the ₩100,000,000 Grand Prize Award at the Second Lezhin World Comics Contest.

The series has been licensed English in print format by Seven Seas Entertainment.

Plot
The story follows Yoon Bum, a young, mentally ill man with a difficult past. After becoming infatuated with Oh Sangwoo, a peer from his time in the military who saved him from a rape attempt, he decides to enter Sangwoo's home while he is out of his house. Yoon Bum finds a tied up, bruised woman in Sangwoo's basement and before he is able to free her, he is discovered by Sangwoo, who is revealed to be a serial killer. Sangwoo then breaks Bum's ankles and despite Yoon Bum's previous love for him, Sangwoo puts Bum into a highly abusive and manipulative relationship until the very end.

Characters
Yoon Bum (윤범)

Yoon Bum is the main character of Killing Stalking. Due to his parents dying when he was little, Bum was given to his grandmother and uncle with the latter severely abusing, raping and starving him, making Yoon Bum a lifelong abused victim due to also getting bullied in school, getting sexually abused and raped in military and Oh Sangwoo abusing him in several ways as well. Bum is a quiet, shy, timid, and sensitive individual who suffers from BPD and often struggles socially. Seeing affection towards him as a sign of love, Bum becomes easily attached to people who show him affection due to his lonely desire for it since he's never having gotten any before. Dealing with his uncle's abuse, loneliness, and thinking that he isn't needed by anyone, Yoon Bum cut his wrists in the past regularly to cope.

Oh Sangwoo (오상우)

Oh Sangwoo is the second main character of Killing Stalking, the primary Antagonist. Behind his fake facade in public, he is actually a cruel and ruthless individual who kidnaps, abuses, tortures, rapes and kills people, showing absolutely no mercy to his victims or remorse for any of his actions. He's highly narcissistic and looks down on everyone, pretending that he actually cares for others, only to strike them with honest hostility when he feels like it.

Yang Seungbae (양승배)

Yang Seungbae is a former investigator who has been demoted to patrolling police officer. As noted by his superior, he appears to pry too much into investigations and trusts his (usually accurate) intuitions even when lacking evidence. Dutiful and prone to skepticism, he often second-guesses others' conclusions. These traits prove to be detrimental, as they cost him his position on the investigation team.

References

External links
 Killing Stalking Official Website on Lezhin 

2016 webtoon debuts
Drama webtoons
Horror webtoons
Seven Seas Entertainment titles
South Korean webtoons